Tanarus was a free 3D multiplayer online tank first-person shooter that was commercially released on December 12, 1997. It was developed under the direction of John Smedley at Verant Interactive and published by Sony Interactive Studios America. Originally titled Armorgeddon, Verant was forced to change the name when another game with that name was discovered. It was released in late 1997. The game was included in Sony Online Entertainment's Station Exchange program in 2007, and shut down on June 10, 2010.

Gameplay
Game arenas (also known as "maps") allowed up to four teams to play at the same time. Each team could contain up to five players. Most of the arenas were created by the player community, although the maps had to be hosted by Sony Online, who would rotate the maps on a monthly basis.

Upon joining the arena, each player selected a tank to operate from the five models available. The tank would then be customized through the utilization of various weapons and support modules. Numerous combinations could be used, contingent on what the player wished to do (capture other teams' flags or fight, for example). The player may have then switched tank models during the game by using one of their base's recon stations. Players saw the Tanarus world through the tank's gun turret.

There was no set objective in Tanarus, though the game presented various goals of team-based combat: Generally, to destroy the other colors' tanks, capture recon stations to provide a tactical or strategic advantage, and, finally, to capture another team's flag, bringing it back to their own base, thus destroying everyone on that team.

Reception 

The game received favorable reviews. GameSpot'''s Chris Gregson concluded, "Some might think $9.95 per month is a little pricey for a single game - that's what Kesmai charges for all of its sundry online-only games on GameStorm, for example - but they need to remember that there's really no other game online like this one. And if it gets its hooks in you, you'll probably consider the price a bargain."Next Generation said, "While the graphics and sound have been kept to a minimum to reduce latency, they're by no means ugly, and with 3D acceleration, there are enough special effects to keep almost anyone happy. At $9.99 a month, Tanarus'' isn't the greatest value for everybody, but for those with the persistence and skill to become good at the game, it's worth the time and money."

References

External links
 

1997 video games
Multiplayer online games
North America-exclusive video games
Sony Interactive Entertainment games
Tank simulation video games
Video games scored by George Sanger
Video games developed in the United States
Windows games
Windows-only games